George W. Gilbert (February 8, 1873 – January 4, 1944) was an American businessman and politician from New York.

Life 
Gilbert was born on February 8, 1873, in Ellenburg Center, New York.

After attending the village school, Gilbert initially taught in the district school and worked as a clerk in the country store. He then worked as a bookkeeper for John Haughran's general store and creameries. He then entered the mercantile business in Ellenburg Center with William H. Gordon under the firm name Gordon & Gilbert. He later worked with George O'Connor under the firm name Gilbert & O'Connor. He sold his interest in the business to William E. Patnode in 1914. In 1916, he bought the hardware and farm implement business The Cheeseman-Munsil Company at Ellenburg Depot. He ran the business until 1938, when he sold it to Ralph L. Robie. He was also an organizer of the State Bank of Ellenburg in 1920, serving as a director and vice-president of the bank from its organization until his death.

Gilbert served as both town clerk and town supervisor of Ellenburg for several years. In 1922, he was elected to the New York State Assembly as a Republican, representing Clinton County. He served in the Assembly in 1923, 1924, and 1925.

In 1909, Gilbert married Jennie Sanborn. They had a daughter, Mrs. W. Scott Perkins.

Gilbert died in the Physician's Hospital in Plattsburgh on January 4, 1944. He was buried in Ellenburg Center Riverside Cemetery.

References

External links 

 The Political Graveyard
 George W. Gilbert at Find a Grave

1873 births
1944 deaths
People from Clinton County, New York
20th-century American businesspeople
Businesspeople from New York (state)
20th-century American politicians
Town supervisors in New York (state)
Republican Party members of the New York State Assembly
Burials in New York (state)